Rotenburg an der Wümme (also known as Rotenburg (Wümme); Rotenburg in Hannover until May 1969; Northern Low Saxon: Rodenborg) is a town in Lower Saxony, Germany. It is the capital of the district of Rotenburg.

Geography
Rotenburg is situated on the Wümme river, which lies between the rivers Elbe and Weser at about the same latitude as Hamburg and Bremen, the latter lying 40 km to the west. It is often called "Rotenburg (Wümme)" in order to distinguish it from Rotenburg an der Fulda in Hesse and Rothenburg ob der Tauber in Bavaria.

History
The town was founded in 1195, when Prince-Bishop Rudolf I of Verden built a castle in the area. The town then belonged to the Prince-Bishopric of Verden which was established in 1180. The castle took its name from the colour of the bricks (rot means "red", Burg "castle"). The adjoining settlement remained a tiny village until the 19th century.

In 1648 the Prince-Bishopric was transformed into the Principality of Verden, which was first ruled in personal union by the Swedish Crown, interrupted by Danish occupation from 1712 to 1715. From then on it was ruled by the Hanoverian Crown.

Swedish period 
After the Thirty Years' War, the rule of the Bishops of Verden ended and Rotenburg became part of the secularised Duchy of Verden under Swedish rule. In this period its new rulers built the castle with the remnants of the Schloss into a modern fortress as an outpost to protect the main fortress at Stade. This rebuilding work required the western part of the town to be demolished, making it necessary to move the main area of settlement to the east. Even the parish church had to be taken down and moved to the site of the present town church.

In the Swedish-Brandenburg War from 1675 to 1676 the town was captured during a military campaign by an alliance of Denmark and several states of the Holy Roman Empire, and it remained in Allied hands until the end of the war in 1679.
In the wake of the Treaty of Saint Germain in 1679 Rotenburg was returned to Sweden.

The fortress remained in operation until roughly 1680. After that it was neglected, the building being torn down and only the fortifications being modernised in places. After 1843 the last ramparts were levelled. In its place today is the terrain of the old local history museum. In the period between 1626 and 1835 there were seven town fires, which destroyed a significant part of the town's infrastructure. Swedish rule lasted until the town was captured by Denmark in 1712.

Later history 

The Kingdom of Hanover incorporated the principality in a real union; the princely territory, including Rotenburg upon Wümme, became part of the new Stade Region, established in 1823. In 1866, Prussia annexed the territory from Hannover. As a result, Rotenburg was renamed Rotenburg in Hannover. In May 1969, the town and district authorities changed the name to "Rotenburg an der Wümme". In 2006, during the World Cup, Rotenburg hosted the national team from Trinidad and Tobago.

Mayor
The mayor of Rotenburg (Wümme) is Andreas Weber (SPD). He was elected in 2014 with 59.6% of the vote.

Sights
The Lutheran Stadtkirche (built between 1860 and 1862, with a baptismal font from the 16th century and a bell from the 14th century)
The War Memorial 1914/18, in memory of those from Rotenburg who fell in World War I
Half-timbered houses in Goethestraße and Große Straße.
The Heimatmuseum (museum of local history)
The Paar-oh-die Fountain in the Neuer Markt

Education
 Kantor-Helmke-Schule (primary school)
 Schule am Grafel (primary school)
 Stadtschule (primary school)
 Theodor-Heuss-Schule (Orientierungstufe)
 Realschule
 Pestalozzischule (Sonderschule)
 Ratsgymnasium
 Berufsbildende Schule (vocational school)
 Fachschule für Sozialpädagogik (Diakonissenmutterhaus)
 Fachschule für Heilerziehungspflege (Health education nursing)
 Kinderkrankenpflegeschule (children's nursing)
 Lindenschule (conducive school for spiritual development)
 Krankenpflegeschule (Nursing)
 Kreismusikschule (music school)
 Montessori-Grundschule
 Volkshochschule

Twinning
  Aalter, Belgium
  Czerwieńsk, Poland
  Falmouth, Cornwall, United Kingdom
  Rotenburg an der Fulda, Hesse, Germany
  Rothenburg, Lucerne, Switzerland
  Rothenburg ob der Tauber, Bavaria, Germany
  Rothenburg, Oberlausitz, Saxony, Germany
  Rothenburg, Saxony-Anhalt, Germany

Notable people
 Yannis Becker (born 1991), footballer
 Ahmet Kuru (born 1982), Turkish footballer
 Dimitri Peters (born 1984), judoka
 Matthias Scherz (born 1971), footballer
 Philip Zwiener (born 1985), basketball national player

References

Rotenburg (district)